Trigamozeucta is a genus of moths of the family Crambidae. It contains only one species, Trigamozeucta radiciformis, which is found on Fiji.

References

Natural History Museum Lepidoptera genus database

Pyraustinae
Taxa named by Edward Meyrick
Monotypic moth genera
Moths of Fiji
Crambidae genera